Maripasoula, previously named Upper Maroni, is a commune of French Guiana, an overseas region and department of France located in South America.

Geography
The Lawa and Maroni Rivers form a natural border with Suriname on the west, and with  Brazil on the south.

Villages

 Alawataimë enï
 Antecume Pata
 Élahé
 Epoja
 Kayodé
 Kulumuli
 Nouveau Wakapou
 Palasisi
 Palimino
 Pëleya
 Pilima
 Talhuwen
 Tedamali

Transport
Maripasoula is served by Maripasoula Airport, with services on one commercial passenger airline.

The commune can be accessed only by air, or by boat via the Maroni river. The unpaved path between Maripasoula and Papaïchton will be turned into a proper road. Road work has commenced on 20 July 2020 and is scheduled to be completed by 2021. There are plans to extend the Route Nationale from Saint-Laurent-du-Maroni to Maripasoula, however the Route Nationale currently ends south of Apatou.

Climate
Maripasoula has a tropical monsoon climate (Köppen Am) and is very warm to hot and humid all year round. Although there is a decline in rainfall between August and November, this is much less marked than in Cayenne and Kourou.

History
The town of Maripasoula was officially founded as Upper Maroni at the end of the 19th century when gold was discovered. In 1953, the residents decided to change the name to Maripasoula. Since the beginning of the 21st century, Maripasoula has been at the heart of a gold rush. The majority of fortune seekers are illegal Brazilian garimpeiro. Efforts by the French gendarme and military to stop the illegal gold mining have resulted in illegal settlements across the Lawa River in Suriname where villages like Antonio do Brinco have sprung up. These villages contain a string of supermarkets, restaurants, bars and brothels, and cater to both the gold prospectors and the town of Maripasoula because of significantly lower prices and convenience.

Because of problems with crime in the region, the town was often referred to as "Far West" in the early 2000's, in a reference to the United States' historical Wild West. In August 2020, the development of the first Lycee de Maripasoula for 820 students was announced, and €32 million for construction work between Maripasoula and Papaïchton.

Population
Maripasoula City's inhabitants are known in French as Maripasouliens and Maripasouliennes. They are mainly the Maroon tribes Aluku (aka Boni), the Amerindian Wayana tribe, and the Saint Lucian and Guadeloupean Creoles. Except for residents of the city centre, the commune has a largely tribal population. The town is very ethnically diverse. In 1945, the town centre was home to 45 people, and the entire region was home to 952 people; today the population has increased from 4,507 people in 2006 to 13,227 in 2016.

Sites of interest

Protected buildings and historical monuments
Near the Maroni River, petroglyphs have been found depicting many animals and humans. Other monuments are the Roches gravées de la crique du Marouini à Maripasoula.

National park
Most of the southern territory of Maripasoula makes up most of the area dedicated to the Guiana Amazonian Park. The Biodiversity of the region of the Amazonian rainforest is one of the richest in the world. Bellevue de l'Inini, the highest mountain in French Guiana, is located in Maripasoula.

Notable residents
Cyrille Regis – former West Bromwich Albion, Coventry City, and England national football team player, born in Maripasoula.
Jacobin Yoma – professional boxer.

See also
 Communes of French Guiana

References

External links
Ville de Maripasoula at Annuaire-Mairie (in French)

Communes of French Guiana